Francisco Javier 'Javi' García Guerrero (born 22 October 1976) is a Spanish retired footballer who played as a striker.

He amassed La Liga totals of 195 games and 48 goals over seven seasons, mainly in representation of Racing de Santander and Recreativo (three years apiece). He added 251 matches and 72 goals in the Segunda División, in a professional career that lasted 18 years.

Club career
Guerrero was born in Madrid. An unsuccessful youth graduate at Real Madrid, he also had loan stints with Real Jaén and Terrassa FC – respectively in the second and third divisions – before being released in the summer of 1999, after which he signed with Albacete Balompié in the former tier, going on to score 20 league goals over two seasons.

Ahead of the 2001–02 campaign, Guerrero joined Atlético Madrid alongside teammate Jesús Muñoz, but he was quickly deemed surplus to requirements by manager Luis Aragonés, moving to Racing de Santander in late August without ever playing a competitive match. He was always first choice during his spell with the Cantabria club, netting an average of 11 goals per season. 

For 2005–06 Guerrero joined RC Celta de Vigo, although he would appear sparingly as the Galician team qualified for the UEFA Cup. He joined Recreativo de Huelva in September 2006 (initially on loan), agreeing to a permanent contract ahead of the 2007–08 season. On 18 May 2008, his last-minute goal in a 1–1 home game against Real Valladolid helped the Andalusians to retain their top-flight status.

After a weak 2008–09 campaign (only two goals, team relegation), the 32-year-old Guerrero returned to division two, signing a two-year deal with UD Las Palmas and being the Canary Islands side's top scorer in his first two seasons at 11 and 12 respectively. In spite of still having one year left in his contract, he retired at the end of 2012–13 with Las Palmas still in the second division, aged nearly 37. 

Guerrero remained attached to his last club, as a match scout. In October 2017, he accepted an offer from Sevilla FC to act as a link between the board of directors and the first team.

References

External links

1976 births
Living people
Spanish footballers
Footballers from Madrid
Association football forwards
La Liga players
Segunda División players
Segunda División B players
Real Madrid C footballers
Real Madrid Castilla footballers
Real Jaén footballers
Terrassa FC footballers
Albacete Balompié players
Atlético Madrid footballers
Racing de Santander players
RC Celta de Vigo players
Recreativo de Huelva players
UD Las Palmas players
Sevilla FC non-playing staff